Sabz Gaz may refer to:
 Sabz Gaz-e Olya
 Sabz Gaz-e Sofla
 Sabz Gaz-e Vosta